Damau (also damaun, dhamu or dhmuva) is a single-headed drum instrument that is played extensively in the folk music of Uttarakhand in India. It is usually played along with the larger drum, the dhol, according to the ancient oral treatise of Dhol Sagar, which lists specific rhythm patterns for every occasion in life, including christening, wedding, religious festivals, folk drama and death rituals.

References

Drums
Indian musical instruments
Asian percussion instruments
Culture of Uttarakhand
Folk music instruments